Nikolay Pavlovich Bogolepov (9 December 1846 – 15 March 1901) was a Russian jurist and Minister of National Enlightenment, assassinated by a Socialist-Revolutionary activist.

Student life
Bogolepov was born in Serpukhov, in the Moscow Governorate of the Russian Empire. His father was a police inspector. In 1857 he moved to Moscow to continue his education in secondary school because his father did not find a satisfactory one in Serpukhov. The father could not afford moving to Moscow himself and Bogolepov had to live alone in a school boarding house. In 1864 he finished the school and entered the Law faculty of the Moscow State University. After graduation he worked in the Criminal Department of the Senate but left it a year after and in 1869 returned to the University for academic studies in Roman law.

Official life

As a young student, Bogolepov was inclined towards revolutionary activity, like all young students, but once he had been accepted by the establishment, he became "a mere tool in the hands of the Procurator of the Holy Synod."

In 1881 he was appointed professor and two years later he was elected rector of the Moscow University continuing lecturing in Roman law. In 1886 two of his children died in a row. Being unable to work in the University after this tragedy he resigned. In 1891 Bogolepov was made rector again but resigned two years after due to constant student unrest.

In 1895 Minister of Popular Enlightenment Ivan Delyanov died. Nicholas II appointed Bogolepov as his successor. Bogolepov faced an enormous bulk of problems, firstly student disturbances that ranged from typical protests and demands for autonomy for universities to revolutionary propaganda. The government introduced various restrictive measures which only made the situation worse. In 1896, according to Konstantin Pobedonostsev, Bogolepov was responsible for decreeing that students who participated in protests were to be drafted into the military. In 1900 Minister of Finance Witte introduced "Temporary Regulations" according to which a university student could be conscripted into the army as a punishment for participation in student riots. Bogolepov was not the author of this highly unpopular innovation, but he approved of it and in the beginning of 1901 he commanded that 183 students of Kiev University were conscripted into the army. On 27 February he was shot in the neck by Pyotr Karpovich, supporter of the Socialist-Revolutionary Party and died on 15 March. Karpovich was sentenced to twenty years of katorga. Five years later he escaped and died in 1917 when a ship with Russian émigrés was sunk by a German submarine.

Bibliography

References

1846 births
1901 deaths
People from Serpukhov
People from Serpukhovsky Uyezd
Government ministers of Russia
Members of the State Council (Russian Empire)
Imperial Moscow University alumni
Academic staff of Moscow State University
Rectors of Moscow State University
Assassinated politicians of the Russian Empire